Baňur is a lake of Slovakia.

References

Lakes of Slovakia